"Hey Boy" is a song by Australian singer-songwriter Sia released on 19 November 2020, through Atlantic Records. It is taken from her album, Music – Songs from and Inspired by the Motion Picture and it follows "Together" and "Courage to Change" as the third single from the album. An alternate version of the track featuring Burna Boy was released on 14 January 2021.

Background, release and promotion 
Sia revealed that "Hey Boy" was originally written for Rihanna.

On 12 November 2020, Sia announced the release of the single through her social media accounts and it was made available for pre-save on streaming platforms. It was released alongside its lyric video on 19 November 2020 at 13:00 UTC. With the release of the single, Sia's ninth studio album Music – Songs from and Inspired by the Motion Picture was made available for pre-order.

Sia performed "Hey Boy" live at the 2020 MTV Movie & TV Awards, on 6 December 2020.

Composition 
"Hey Boy" was written by Sia, Jesse Shatkin and Kamille and has a length of 2:29. Derrick Rossignol of Uproxx described it as "a quick dose of bouncy pop in which Sia expresses a desire for some male company." Billboard described the track as a "hip-swiveling tune", while NMEs Nick Levine penned that it is a "dancehall bop with an infectious hint of grit".

 Credits and personnel 
Credits adapted from TIDAL.

 Sia Furler – writer, vocals
 Kamille – writer
 Jesse Shatkin – writer, producer, bass, drum programmer, drums, engineer, guitar, keyboards, organ, percussion, synthesizer
 Sean Kantrowitz – guitar
 Sam Dent – engineer
 Serban Ghenea – mixer
 John Hanes – mixing engineer
 Chris Gehringer – masterer

 Burna Boy version 

An alternate version of "Hey Boy" featuring Nigerian artist Burna Boy was released on 14 January 2021, alongside an animated music video. It is featured on Music – Songs from and Inspired by the Motion Picture as a bonus track.

 Composition 
Burna Boy is credited as a songwriter on the alternate version of "Hey Boy"; it runs for a length of 3:01. On the track, Burna Boy performs background vocals and lends a rap verse.

 Music video 
The animated music video for "Hey Boy", directed by Rafatoon, premiered alongside the track's release on 14 January 2021. In the video, Sia, depicted as a "voluptuous" diva, is chased around by a "horny anthropomorphic wolf". Burna Boy, backup dancers and other characters also appear throughout the video as animals. Claire Shaffer of Rolling Stone noted the video took inspiration from Disney cartoons of the 1980s and 1990s, such as Red Hot Riding Hood, Who Framed Roger Rabbit and A Goofy Movie, and described it as a "vibrant and colorful concert sequence". Billboard described the video as "eye-popping" and Sia, in it, as a "21st century Jessica Rabbit".

 Charts 

 Track listings 

 Digital download and streaming "Hey Boy" – 2:29

 Digital download and streaming "Hey Boy" (feat. Burna Boy) – 3:01

 Digital download and streaming – The Remixes EP'

 "Hey Boy" (Country Club Martini Crew Remix) – 3:02
 "Hey Boy" (Wideboys Remix) – 2:27
 "Hey Boy" (Stave Remix) – 3:29
 "Hey Boy" (feat. Burna Boy) – 3:01

Release history

References

2020 singles
2020 songs
Animated music videos
Burna Boy songs
Sia (musician) songs
Song recordings produced by Jesse Shatkin
Songs written by Burna Boy
Songs written by Kamille (musician)
Songs written by Jesse Shatkin
Songs written by Sia (musician)
Atlantic Records singles